The 2021 Atlantic 10 men's basketball tournament (A-10) was the postseason men's basketball tournament for the Atlantic 10 Conference's 2020–21 season. It was originally scheduled to be held from March 10 through March 14, 2021, at the Barclays Center in Brooklyn, New York. Due to COVID-19 regulations, the tournament was moved to Richmond, Virginia and was set to be played entirely at the Robins Center and Siegel Center, respectively homes of A-10 members Richmond and VCU.

The A-10 later announced that it had swapped the dates of its men's and women's tournaments. The bulk of the men's tournament was now played at the aforementioned Richmond venues from March 3 through 6. The first round and both semifinals were hosted by VCU, while the second round and both quarterfinals were split between both venues. The women's tournament, being held at the Siegel Center, took over the original men's tournament dates. Both tournament finals were held on March 14, with the women's final in Richmond and the men's final at UD Arena in Dayton, Ohio.

Seeds
All 14 A-10 schools participated in the tournament. Teams were seeded by winning percentage within the conference, with a tiebreaker system to seed teams with identical percentages. Any team that did not play above 60 percent of the median number of conference games played by other members would be seeded by their NET ranking within the conference rather than by winning percentage, but all teams ultimately qualified to be seeded by winning percentage. The top 10 teams received a first-round bye and the top four teams received a double-bye, automatically advancing them to the quarterfinals.

Schedule

*Game times in Eastern Time.

Bracket

* denotes overtime period

References

Tournament
Atlantic 10 men's basketball tournament
College sports in Ohio
College sports in Virginia

2021 in Richmond, Virginia
Atlantic 10 men's basketball tournament
Atlantic 10 men's basketball tournament
Atlantic 10 men's basketball tournament